Microcolona leucosticta is a moth in the family Elachistidae. It is found in southern India.

References

Moths described in 1928
Microcolona
Moths of Asia